Roger Donald Dickerson (born August 24, 1934) is a New Orleans pianist, composer, and educator.

Biography 
Coming from a musical family, Dickerson began piano lessons at 8 years old. In elementary school he played the French horn, baritone and tuba. His experience playing brass instruments continued in college where he played trombone. From a young age, Dickerson was interested in, and influenced by the music of the French Quarter. At 15 Dickerson played in a popular music band called "Roger Dickerson and his Groovy Boys", which played high schools and community centres in his neighbourhood; showing the influence of current New Orleans musical culture. Wallace Davenport, a jazz trumpeter, versed in styes ranging from traditional jazz to bebop, was Dickerson's uncle. From Wallace, Dickerson got his first introductions to harmony, counterpoint and orchestration. After high school, Dickerson studied music at Dillard University earning his Bachelor of Music in 1955, then a Master's degree in music from Indiana University in 1957 where he studied with Bernhard Heiden.

After finishing his Master's degree, Dickerson joined the United States Army. While in the Army, he played in service bands around Europe. After two years in the Army, Dickerson was able to travel to Vienna on a Fulbright Scholarship, where he studied music with Karl Schiske and Alfred Uhl. In 1965 he was elected to the American Society of Composers, Authors and Publishers. Dickerson has received notable commissions, including a series of concert pieces commissioned by the Rockefeller Foundation in 1972, and his New Orleans Concerto, commissioned in 1976 by the New Orlean's Centennial Commission. This concerto serves as the focal point of the 1978 PBS documentary New Orleans Concerto.

Dickerson is a professor emeritus at Southern University of New Orleans (SUNO). There he was the University Choir Director and Music Coordinator. Along with elements of New Orleans culture, Dickerson's work shows the influence of Jazz and Blues music.

Work list

Orchestral 

 Concert Overture (1957)
 Essay, band (1958)
 Fugue 'n' Blues, jazz orchestra (1959)
 A Musical Service for Louis (1972)
 Orpheus an' His Slide Trombone (J. Greenberg), 1974–1975)
 New Orleans Concerto, for piano & orchestra (1976)

Vocal 

 Fair Dillard (J. N. Barnum), SATB (1955)
 Music I Heard (C. Aiken), for soprano & piano (1956)
 The Negro Speaks of Rivers (L. Hughes), for soprano & piano (1961)
 Ps xlix, SATB, timpani (1979)
 African-American Celebration (Dickerson), SATB (1984)
 Beyond Silence (Dickerson), for soprano, baritone, 3 trumpets, 3 trombones, timpani & organ (1986)

Chamber and solo instrumental 

 Prekussion, percussion ensemble (1954)
 Music for Brass, 2 trumpets, trombone (1955)
 Woodwind Trio (1955)
 Das neugeborne Kindelein, chorale prelude, organ (1956)
 Sonatina, piano (1956)
 String Quartet (1956)
 Music for String Trio (1957)
 Scene, horn, string quartet (1959)
 Movment, trumpet, piano (1960)
 Sonata, clarinet, piano (1960)
 Wind Quintet (1961)
 Concert Pieces for Beginning String Players (1972)
 Expressions, violin, piano (1983)
 Incantation, violin, piano (1983)
 Fanfare, 2 trumpets, timpani (1991)

References

External links

Living people
1934 births
Dillard University alumni
Indiana University alumni
African-American composers
African-American jazz pianists
21st-century African-American people
20th-century African-American people